Novaya Uralka (Yañı Ural) is a rural locality (a village) in Otradinsky Selsoviet, Kuyurgazinsky District, Bashkortostan, Russia. The population was 232 as of 2010. There are 2 streets.

Geography 
Novaya Uralka is located 3 km south of Yermolayevo (the district's administrative centre) by road. Aysuak is the nearest rural locality.

References 

Rural localities in Kuyurgazinsky District